Hedwig of Swabia (died August 28, 994, in Hohentwiel) was the wife of Burchard III, Duke of Swabia. A daughter of Henry I, Duke of Bavaria and Judith, Duchess of Bavaria, she patronised the formation of the St. George's Abbey, Stein am Rhein in 970.

References 

994 deaths
German duchesses
Daughters of monarchs